The women's sprint competition at the 2014 Asian Games was held from 23 to 25 September at the Incheon International Velodrome.

Schedule
All times are Korea Standard Time (UTC+09:00)

Records

Results
Legend
REL — Relegated

Qualifying

Quarterfinals

Heat 1

Heat 2

Heat 3

Heat 4

Race for 5th–8th places

Semifinals

Heat 1

Heat 2

Finals

Bronze

Gold

Final standing

References 
Results

External links 
 

Track Women sprint